Hastula hectica, common name the sandbeach auger, is a species of sea snail, a marine gastropod mollusc in the family Terebridae, the auger snails.

Description
The length of the shell varies between 30 mm and 80 mm.

Distribution
This species occurs in the Red Sea and the Indo-West Pacific.

References

 Dautzenberg, Ph. (1929). Contribution à l'étude de la faune de Madagascar: Mollusca marina testacea. Faune des colonies françaises, III(fasc. 4). Société d'Editions géographiques, maritimes et coloniales: Paris. 321–636, plates IV-VII pp.
 Bratcher T. & Cernohorsky W.O. (1987). Living terebras of the world. A monograph of the recent Terebridae of the world. American Malacologists, Melbourne, Florida & Burlington, Massachusetts. 240pp.
 Terryn Y. (2007). Terebridae: A Collectors Guide. Conchbooks & NaturalArt. 59pp + plates. 
 Severns M. (2011) Shells of the Hawaiian Islands – The Sea Shells. Conchbooks, Hackenheim. 564 pp
 Castelin M., Puillandre N., Kantor Yu. I., Modica M.V., Terryn Y., Cruaud C., Bouchet P. & Holford M. (2012) Macroevolution of venom apparatus innovations in auger snails (Gastropoda; Conoidea; Terebridae). Molecular Phylogenetics and Evolution 64: 21–44

External links
 Gastropods.com: Impages hectica 44

Terebridae
Gastropods described in 1758
Taxa named by Carl Linnaeus
Fauna of the Red Sea